Statistics of Latvian Higher League in the 1988 season.

Overview
It was contested by 16 teams, and RAF won the championship.

League standings

References
 RSSSF

Latvian SSR Higher League
Football 
Latvia